Shri Lalbuaia is an Indian politician from Mizoram.

He was elected to the Rajya Sabha (the Upper House of the Parliament of India) from 1972–1978 from the Indian National Congress party.

See also
List of Rajya Sabha members from Mizoram

References

Rajya Sabha members from Mizoram
Possibly living people
Year of birth missing (living people)
Mizo people